2030 (MMXXX)  is a future year in the 21st century.

2030 may also refer to:

 2030 (film), a 2014 Vietnamese film written and directed by Nguyễn Võ Nghiêm Minh
 2030 (novel), a 2011 novel written by Albert Brooks